Dijana Ujkić  (in Albanian: Diana Ujkaj ,born 5 July 1996) is a Montenegrin handball player for Minaur Baia Mare and the Montenegrin national team.

International honours 
EHF Champions League: 
Fourth place: 2017

Individual awards
 Handball-Planet.com Young World Right Wing of the Season: 2018

References

External links

 

1996 births
Living people
Montenegrin female handball players
Sportspeople from Podgorica
Expatriate handball players 
Montenegrin expatriate sportspeople in Romania
Albanians in Montenegro
Mediterranean Games medalists in handball
Mediterranean Games silver medalists for Montenegro
Competitors at the 2018 Mediterranean Games